Weever may refer to:

 Weeverfish (or weevers)  fishes of family Trachinidae, order Trachiniformes, part of the Percomorpha clade.

People
 Guy E. L. de Weever (1907-1971) Guyanese educator
 John Weever (1576-1632) English poet
 Nicole de Weever (born 1979) dancer from Sint Maarten

See also

 
 
 Weevil (disambiguation)
 Weaver (disambiguation)